National Life & General Insurance Company SAOG. (NLG Oman) is an insurance company in Oman. NLG Oman, part of the Ominvest Group retained its leadership position as the top insurer in Oman in terms of gross written premiums in 2019. The company has a strong network of intermediary brokers and agencies with around 190+ combined touch point for policy sales and servicing in Oman, UAE and Kuwait. The company offers both life and general insurance products through its brokers, bancassurance partners, online and other channels.

History

The company was established in 1995 and was a subsidiary of Oman National Investment Corp (ONIC). It is the first insurer in Oman. The company came into the fold of Ominvest after the merger between Ominvest and ONIC in 2015.

Operations

OMAN:

The company is a dominant player in health insurance industry with a market share of over 65% in Oman and is a well recognized brand, providing insurance protection to nearly 200,000 individuals. The company contributed RO 175,000 towards Endowment Fund for supporting government initiatives to overcome the threat of COVID-19.

UAE:

The company is one of the top 5 stand-alone Health Insurance providers in the UAE market. They have achieved Gross Written premium of around AED 1.4 Billion in the FY 2019.

KUWAIT:

The Kuwait operation is another feather in the cap of insurance major’s wide network coverage. The company offers various products in life, general and corporate insurance and is the market leader in medical insurance.

Financial Strength

In May 2020, A M Best affirmed the Financial Strength Rating of B++(Good) and the Long-Term Issuer Credit Rating of “bbb+” of NLGIC with stable outlook. It also has ISO 9001:2008 certification from British Standards Institute (BSI). These ratings together give its clients and associates an assurance of the company’s financial strength and guarantee quality in systems and processes.

CSR

As part of the social responsibility, the company distributed school bags to needy students.

Awards and recognition

The company recently won the “Best Insurance Company Digital Transformation Oman 2020” award from Global Banking & Finance Review.

References

External links
 

Insurance companies of Oman
Financial services companies established in 1983
Companies based in Muscat, Oman